Golf Club of Lebanon is a country club and golf course founded in 1923 and is located in Beirut, Lebanon.

The club has an 18-hole golf course, six tennis courts, an aquatic center, a squash court and other recreational and social facilities.

The Golf Club of Lebanon (GCL) was established in 1923, according to the records of the Royal and Ancient Golf Club of St Andrews, known as the “Home of Golf”. It is the oldest and largest golf club in Lebanon, and the only one still standing today from the four golf clubs that were present.

Golf clubs and courses in Lebanon
Sports venues in Lebanon
Sports venues completed in 1923
Sport in Beirut
Organisations based in Beirut
1923 establishments in Asia